Deborah Lynn Watson is a retired American movie and television actress. She was born on January 17, 1949, in Culver City, California.

Career
Watson began her acting in community theater, appearing in productions at Long Beach Community Theater, Tustin Community Theater, and Melodyland Theater.

Television
Watson got her start on television as a hopeful on Ted Mack and the Original Amateur Hour in 1963. She went on to star as the boy-struck teenage girl Karen Scott in the 1964 situation comedy television series Karen, the only portion of the largely unsuccessful 90 Bristol Court (which also included Harris Against the World and Tom, Dick and Mary) to last the entirety of the 1964-1965 season. She then appeared as Tammy Tarleton in the 1965 rural-themed sitcom TV series Tammy, with co-stars Denver Pyle and Frank McGrath.

Film
Watson's film appearances include the character of Marilyn Munster in Munster, Go Home! in 1966. The actress was a Universal Pictures starlet at the time, and the studio used Watson to replace Pat Priest, who had played Marilyn through most of The Munsters TV sitcom series. In 1967, Watson co-starred with Roddy McDowall in The Cool Ones, followed by Tammy and the Millionaire, which comprised four episodes of Tammy re-edited into a feature-length film.

Later career
When Watson was 17 years old she married record producer-engineer Richard Sanford Orshoff, who was then 22. In August 1967, they had a child, Darren. Watson and Orshoff divorced in 1971. She made her final TV appearance on Love, American Style in 1971 before retiring from acting. In 1973 she married Ronald L Taylor (now a retired Superior Court Judge), and they had a son, Dylan. Watson lives in Southern California and on the Oregon coast. Most recently, in 2003, she appeared in A&E's Biography episode of The Munsters.

Television series
Karen (1964–65)
Tammy (1965–66)
The Virginian (1967 and 1969)
Love, American Style (1970 and 1971)

Filmography

Munster, Go Home! (1966)
Tammy and the Millionaire (1967), four episodes of Tammy re-edited into a feature film
The Cool Ones (1967)

References

External links

Living people
20th-century American actresses
American child actresses
American film actresses
American television actresses
Actresses from California
21st-century American women
1949 births